Cristiano Castro Gomes (born 5 August 1994) is a Portuguese footballer  who plays for Marítimo B, as a defender.

Football career
On 1 September 2017, Gomes made his professional debut with Marítimo in a 2017–18 Taça da Liga match against Estoril Praia.

References

External links

Stats and profile at LPFP 

1994 births
Living people
Sportspeople from Funchal
Portuguese footballers
Association football defenders
C.S. Marítimo players
Primeira Liga players